The Cape Hinchinbrook Light is a lighthouse located near the southern end of Hinchinbrook Island adjacent to Prince William Sound, in Alaska, United States.

History

The Cape Hinchinbrook Lighthouse was first established in 1910 to mark the entrance to Prince William Sound. Congress authorized the construction of a lighthouse at this point in 1906 appropriating $125,000 for its construction. However, the full amount was not authorized in one lump sum. The money was appropriated over a number of years with $25,000 in 1906, $50,000 in 1907 and the rest in 1908. As a result, construction did not begin until 1909. In the winter of 1909 a temporary fixed white light was established on the second story of the building under construction. Due to the earthquakes in 1927 and 1928, which caused instability in the cliff around the lighthouse, it was felt a new light should be built on solid rock. The new  octagonal tower was completed in 1934. The lighthouse was automated in 1974 and a solar-powered Vega lens was installed. The original third order Fresnel lens is on display at the Valdez Museum and Historical Archive in Valdez, Alaska.

It was listed on the National Register of Historic Places as Cape Hinchinbrook Light Station in 2005.  The listing was for a historic district including two contributing buildings, three contributing structure, one contributing site, and three contributing objects.

Climate

See also

 List of lighthouses in the United States
 National Register of Historic Places listings in Chugach Census Area, Alaska

References

External links
 
 Lighthouse Friends — Cape Hinchinbrook Lighthouse
 
 Valdez Museum and Historical Archive 

1910 establishments in Alaska
Art Deco architecture in Alaska
Buildings and structures on the National Register of Historic Places in Chugach Census Area, Alaska
Historic districts on the National Register of Historic Places in Alaska
Lighthouses completed in 1910
Lighthouses completed in 1934
Lighthouses in Unorganized Borough, Alaska
Lighthouses on the National Register of Historic Places in Alaska